Volleyball at the 2010 Summer Youth Olympics took place August 21–26 at Toa Payoh Sports Hall in Singapore.

Teams

Medal summary

Participating teams

Boys

Girls

External links
 FIVB competition site boys
 FIVB competition site girls

 
2010 Summer Youth Olympics events
Youth Olympics
Volleyball competitions in Singapore
2010